The following is a list of notable events and releases of the year 1955 in Norwegian music.

Events

June
 1 – The 3rd Bergen International Festival started in Bergen, Norway (June 1 – 15).

Deaths

 October
 26 – Arne Eggen, composer and organist (born 1881).

Births

 January
 10 – Ole Henrik Giørtz, jazz pianist, arranger and bandleader.

 February
 27 – Terje Tønnesen, violinist.

 April
 19
 Rolf Løvland, composer and lyricist (Eurovision Song Contest).
 Rune Klakegg, jazz pianist and composer.

 May
 18 – Kjetil Bjerkestrand, keyboardist, composer, music arranger and record producer.

 June
 7 – Jon Balke, jazz pianist and composer (Magnetic North Orchestra).

 July
 9 – Jan Kåre Hystad, jazz saxophonist (Bergen Big Band).
 15 – Pål Thowsen, jazz drummer.

 October
 1 – Morten Gunnar Larsen, jazz pianist and composer.

 December
 28 – Yngve Slettholm, composer.

See also
 1955 in Norway
 Music of Norway

References

 
Norwegian music
Norwegian
Music
1950s in Norwegian music